Dharamchand Chordia (1949/50 – 10 March 2021) was a leader of Bharatiya Janata Party from Maharashtra. He was a member of the Maharashtra Legislative Council. Chordia served as the general secretary of the state unit of the party.

References

20th-century births
Year of birth uncertain
2021 deaths
Members of the Maharashtra Legislative Council
People from Dhule
Bharatiya Janata Party politicians from Maharashtra